John Woodward was an Australian rugby league footballer who played in the 1900s and 1910s.  He played for Balmain and was a foundation player of the club.  Woodward also played one season for North Sydney.

Playing career
Woodward was a foundation player for Balmain in 1908 and competed in the club's first season which was also the first season of rugby league in Australia.

Woodward played with Balmain up until the end of 1913 and then joined North Sydney in 1915 playing 1 season for Norths before retiring.

Woodward played representative football for New South Wales in 1910 making 1 appearance against Queensland in the interstate series.

His brother, James Woodward also played first grade rugby league for Balmain and Annandale between 1911 and 1914.

References

Australian rugby league players
Balmain Tigers players
North Sydney Bears players
New South Wales rugby league team players
Rugby league players from Sydney
Rugby league locks
Rugby league props
Place of birth missing
Place of death missing
Year of birth missing
Year of death missing